Ubiquity Records is an independent American Record Label that focuses on multiple genres, including but not limited to hip hop, electronic,  funk, Latin, soul, jazz, singer/songwriters and other musical genres.

History
Ubiquity Records was conceived by Michael McFadin in the late 80’s after reading an article about how Delicious Vinyl was inspired by an article on Def Jam Records. He founded the label in 1990 along with his wife at the time out of the back of his record shop Groove Merchant Records in the Lower Haight of San Francisco.

In 1989, Groove Merchant was a first of its kind (in the U.S.) boutique record shop in the Lower Haight area of San Francisco that specialized in vintage jazz, funk and soul genres.  The shop soon got a reputation as ‘the place’ for collectors and musicians to visit when in town. Some frequent customers included  Q-Tip from A Tribe Called Quest, Jamiroquai, Red Hot Chili Peppers, DJ Shadow, DJ Lethal, Neneh Cherry and her father Don Cherry, Tracy Chapman, Victor Willis of the Village People, Craig Kallman, Biz Markie, Marques Wyatt, Dante Ross, Dee-Lite and most notably the Beastie Boys who gave Michael a shout out in their song ‘Professor Booty’ “This one goes out to my man, the Groove Merchant, Coming through with beats for which I've been searching, Like two sealed copies, of Expansions, I'm like Tom Vu with yachts and mansions”.

Ubiquity Recordings is located in Costa Mesa, California, with an office in DTLA, California. Ubiquity has two imprint labels, Luv N' Haight (specializing in reissues) and Cubop Records (specializing in Latin jazz and salsa). Including all three imprints, the label has released over 8000 songs spanning all genres of music.

Artists

Ubiquity
 Babatunde Lea 
 Beatless
 Blank Blue 
 Breakestra
 Bugs
 Clutchy Hopkins
 Connie Price and the Keystones
 Darondo
 DJ Greyboy
 DJ Nobody
 Eddie Harris
 Eric Lau

 James Taylor Quartet
 Jeremy Ellis
 Jimi Tenor
 Kirk Degiorgio (As One)
 Nomo
 Ohmega Watts
 Orgone
 Platinum Pied Pipers
 Puracane

 Roy Davis Jr.
 Sa-Ra Creative Partners 
 Shawn Lee 
 The Lions
 Theo Parrish

Cubop
Francisco Aguabella
Jack Costanzo
Bobby Matos
Dave Pike
Arturo Sandoval
Snowboy

Luv N' Haight
Gloria Ann Taylor
Weldon Irvine
RAMP
Darondo
Mike James Kirkland

References

External links 
California-based Ubiquity Records wins Label of the Year
December Marks Ubiquity Records' Fifteenth Anniversary
Best of OC: The Arts and Other Highfalutin' Stuff
 Dedicated to the Groove: Ubiquity Records celebrates 10 years of bringing out the music
Official Site

Record labels established in 1993
House music record labels
World music record labels
Folk record labels
Electronic music record labels
Psychedelic trance record labels
Pop record labels
Easy listening record labels
Smooth jazz record labels
Soundtrack record labels
Hip hop record labels
Electronic dance music record labels
Experimental music record labels